
Gmina Brusy is an urban-rural gmina (administrative district) in Chojnice County, Pomeranian Voivodeship, in northern Poland.

The gmina contains part of the protected area called Zaborski Landscape Park.

Villages
Apart from the town of Brusy, Gmina Brusy contains the villages and settlements of Antoniewo, Asmus, Broda, Brusy Wybudowanie, Brusy-Jaglie, Chłopowy, Czapiewice, Czapiewice Wybudowanie, Czarniż, Czarnowo, Czernica, Czyczkowy, Czyczkowy Wybudowanie, Dąbrówka, Gacnik, Gapowo, Giełdon, Główczewice, Huta, Kaszuba, Kaszuba Leśna, Kinice, Kosobudy, Krównia, Kruszyn, Kubinowo, Lamk, Laska, Lendy, Leśno, Lubnia, Małe Chełmy, Małe Gliśno, Męcikał, Męcikał-Struga, Młynek, Okręglik, Orlik, Parowa, Parzyn, Peplin, Pokrzywno, Przymuszewo, Rolbik, Rudziny, Skoszewo, Spierwia, Turowiec, Wawrzyn, Widno, Wielkie Chełmy, Windorp, Wysoka Zaborska, Żabno, Zalesie and Zimna Kawa.

Neighbouring gminas
Gmina Brusy is bordered by the gminas of Chojnice, Czersk, Dziemiany, Karsin, Lipnica and Studzienice.

References
Polish official population figures 2006

Brusy
Chojnice County